The men's daoshu / gunshu all-around competition at the 2008 Beijing Wushu Tournament was held on August 21 at the Olympic Sports Center Gymnasium.

Background 
Zhao Qingjian and Jia Rui were clearly the favorites ahead of the competition. Zhao was nearing the end of his competitive career, having won multiple times at the World Wushu Championships, East Asian Games, and at the National Games of China. Jia, who was nine years younger, was still starting his international competitive career, but was already a medalist at the 2006 Asian Games, East Asian Games, and the World Wushu Championships. At the 2007 World Wushu Championships, Zhao won the gold medal in daoshu and Jia won the gold medal. Zhao dropped out of the gunshu event and Jia was able to win the gold medal. At the Beijing Wushu Tournament, Zhao Qingjian won both events by a wide margin, obtaining the second-highest combined score in the entire competition.

Schedule 
All times are Beijing Time (UTC+08:00)

Results 
The events were judged without the degree of difficulty component.

 Legend
 DNS — Did not start

References

External Links 

 Official Website
Men's_daoshu_and_gunshu